On a Clear Day is a 1980 studio album by the pianist George Shearing, accompanied by the double bassist Brian Torff.

Track listing
 Spoken Introduction by George Shearing – 0:27
 "Love for Sale" (Cole Porter) – 9:32
 "On a Clear Day (You Can See Forever)" (Burton Lane, Alan Jay Lerner) – 6:13
 "Brasil '79" (Brian Torff) – 4:55
 "Don't Explain" (Arthur Herzog Jr., Billie Holiday) – 6:07
 "Happy Days Are Here Again" (Milton Ager, Jack Yellen) – 2:52
 "Have You Met Miss Jones?" (Lorenz Hart, Richard Rodgers) – 3:48
 "Blue Island Blues" (Torff) – 5:04
 "Lullaby of Birdland" (Shearing, George David Weiss) – 5:31

Personnel

Performance
George Shearing – piano
Brian Torff - double bass

References

1980 live albums
George Shearing albums
Albums produced by Carl Jefferson
Concord Records albums